The Indian National Defence Academy (NDA) is the joint services academy of the Indian Armed Forces, where cadets of the three armed forces (the Army, the Navy and the Air Force) train together before beginning pre-commission training at their respective service academies (Indian Military Academy (IMA), Indian Naval Academy (INA), and Air Force Academy (AFA) for army, navy, and air force cadets respectively). Established in 1954 and located in vicinity of Khadakwasla Dam, near Pune, it is the world's first tri-service academy.

NDA is not the only officer training academy in India. Besides NDA, which is tri-service academy, the Indian Army's IMA, Officers Training Academy (OTA), Army Cadet College (ACC), the Indian Navy's INA, and the Air Force's AFA are the other officer training academies of India. Besides cadets from NDA, these academies accept cadets separately from several streams.  Apart from these, the Indian Army has three establishments for technical stream which include College of Military Engineering (CME), Military College of Telecommunication Engineering (MCTE), and Military College of Electronics and Mechanical Engineering (MCEME). Although cadets are imparted technical training at these three academies, they are commissioned through OTA, Gaya. Excluding all these establishments, which are meant for combat arms, the Indian Army has other commissioning academies for support services such as the Medical Corps, and the Judge Advocate General's Department for example.

Similarly, the Aeronautical Engineers (Electronics) and Aeronautical Engineers (Mechanical) are trained at the Air Force Technical College at Jalahalli, Bengaluru; the Meteorological branch officer cadets get their training at Air Force Administrative College, Coimbatore.

NDA alumni have led and participated in every major conflict in which the Indian Armed Forces have been called into action since the academy was founded. Alumni include three Param Vir Chakra recipients and eleven Ashoka Chakra recipients. The NDA has produced 32 service chiefs of staff, including the incumbent chiefs of staff of the Army, Navy and Air Force.

Chiefs of staff

, the academy has produced twelve Chiefs of the Army Staff (COAS), Eleven Chiefs of the Naval Staff (CNS) and Nine Chiefs of the Air Staff (CAS). All incumbent service chiefs (Chief of the Army Staff General Manoj Mukund Naravane, Chief of the Naval Staff Admiral Karambir Singh and Chief of the Air Staff ACM Rakesh Kumar Singh Bhadauria ) are NDA alumni.

Chief of the Army Staff

Chief of the Naval Staff

Chief of the Air Staff

Wartime award recipients
, 3 Param Vir Chakras, 31 Maha Vir Chakras and 160 Vir Chakras have been awarded to NDA officers.

Param Vir Chakra
Three officers from NDA have posthumously received the Param Vir Chakra, India's highest wartime gallantry award. All three were from the Army.

Maha Vir Chakra
Thirty-one NDA officers have received the Maha Vir Chakra, India's second-highest wartime gallantry award: two from the Air Force, one from the Navy and the remainder from the Army. Ten received the award posthumously. Air Force squadron leader Padmanabha Gautam is the only NDA officer to receive the award twice, in 1965 and 1971 (posthumously).

Vir Chakra
One hundred sixty NDA alumni have been awarded the Vir Chakra, India's third-highest wartime award. Of these, 96 are from the Army, 13 from the Navy and 51 from the Air Force. Notable recipients include Admiral Laxmi Narayan Ramdas, Admiral Vijai Singh Shekhawat, Wing Commander Abhinandan Varthaman and Admiral Vishnu Bhagwat. & Lt Gen Yogesh Kumar Joshi.

Peacetime award recipients
, 11 Ashok Chakras, 40 Kirti Chakras, and 135 Shaurya Chakras, have been awarded to NDA officers.

Ashoka Chakra
Eleven NDA officers have received the Ashok Chakra, India's highest peacetime gallantry award. Of them, one is from the Air Force and the remainder are from the Army. Ten officers received the award posthumously. Wing commander Rakesh Sharma of the Air Force is the only living NDA Air Force officer to receive the award.

Kirti Chakra
Forty NDA alumni have received the Kirti Chakra, India's second-highest peacetime gallantry award. Of these, seven are from the Air Force and the remainder from the Army. Notable recipients include Colonel Neelakantan Jayachandran Nair, who is also an Ashok Chakra recipient Lieutenant colonel Nectar Sanjenbam who is also a Shaurya Chakra recipient.

Shaurya Chakra
A total of 135 NDA alumni have received the Shaurya Chakra, India's third-highest peacetime gallantry award. Eighty-nine are from the Army, 18 from the Navy and 28 from the Air Force. Notable recipients include Major Rajiv Kumar Joon, who is also an Ashok Chakra recipient.

Others

Notes

Footnotes

Citations

References

External links

Official website of NDA